Tazopsine is a plant-isolate morphinan.

External links
 A plant-derived morphinan as a novel lead compound active against malaria liver stages

Benzylisoquinoline alkaloids
Morphinans
Phenols
Phenol ethers